The 2018–19 Welsh Alliance League, known as the Lock Stock Welsh Alliance League for sponsorship reasons, was the 35th season of the Welsh Alliance League, which consisted of two divisions: the third and fourth levels of the Welsh football pyramid.

There were fifteen teams in each division, with the champions of Division 1 promoted to the new FAW Championship North & Mid and the bottom two were relegated to Division 2. In Division 2, the champions and runners-up were promoted to Division 1. No team was relegated from Division 2 as Meliden resigned from the Welsh Alliance League at the end of the season.

The season began on 11 August 2018 and concluded on 18 May 2019.

Division 1

Teams
Conwy Borough were champions in the previous season and were promoted to the Cymru Alliance. They were replaced by Llandudno Junction who were relegated from the Cymru Alliance.

The bottom two teams from the previous season, Pwllheli and Trearddur Bay, were relegated to Division 2 for 2018–19. However, Trearddur Bay resigned from the league in August 2018. Division 2 champions, Prestatyn Sports and runners-up, Bodedern Athletic were promoted in their place.

Grounds and locations

League table

Results

Division 2

Teams
Prestatyn Sports were champions in the previous season and were promoted to Division 1 along with runners-up, Bodedern Athletic. They were replaced by Pwllheli who were relegated from Division 1.

The bottom two teams from the previous season were Llannerch-y-medd and Llanfairpwll. However, Llannerch-y-medd were not relegated and Llanfairpwll resigned from the league in August 2018. Gwynedd League champions, Holyhead Town and Vale of Clwyd and Conwy Football League Premier Division champions, Kinmel Bay were promoted in their place.

Grounds and locations

League table

Results

References

Welsh Alliance League seasons
2018–19 in Welsh football